Christopher Stephen Gott (born 5 August 1965) is a former English cricketer.  Gott was a right-handed batsman who bowled right-arm medium-fast.  He was born in Calverley, Pudsey, Yorkshire.

Gott represented the Yorkshire Cricket Board in a single List A match against  Gloucestershire Cricket Board in the 1999 NatWest Trophy.  In his only List A match, he wasn't required to bat or bowl.

References

External links
Christopher Gott at Cricinfo

1965 births
Living people
Cricketers from Pudsey
English cricketers
Yorkshire Cricket Board cricketers
Northumberland cricketers
English cricketers of 1969 to 2000
People from Calverley